Westmount Summit is the summit of one of the three peaks of Mount Royal (along with Mount Royal proper and Outremont) located in the City of Westmount, Quebec, Canada. Part of the geographical summit is located adjacent to the Montreal borough of Côte-des-Neiges–Notre-Dame-de-Grâce.

A lookout is located on its southern face, providing views over Westmount, Montreal, the south shore and the Eastern Townships. Saint Joseph's Oratory is on the northern side, on Queen Mary Road in Côte-des-Neiges.

Summit woods
McGill University owned the land on Westmount Summit in the late nineteenth century, which it used for a botanical garden. In the early twentieth century, McGill donated the land to the City of Westmount on the condition that it become a bird sanctuary. Today, there are about 180 species of bird on Westmount Summit.

There are also many species of wild plant and flowers located in the summit woods.

The summit woods are bordered on all sides by Summit Circle, a notable residential portion of Westmount.

References

Westmount, Quebec
Mount Royal
Parks in Montreal
Bird sanctuaries of Canada
Mountains of Quebec under 1000 metres
Côte-des-Neiges–Notre-Dame-de-Grâce